Mohammed al-Habib al-Fourkani (1922 in Tahannaout – 2008) was a Moroccan writer, historian and politician who played an important role during the struggle for independence, during which he was exiled (December 9, 1952 – January 14, 1954) and imprisoned two times by the French. He studied at the Ben Youssef School of Marrakech before he joined the national independence movement in 1943. His first newspaper articles appeared in the journal At-Taqaddoum (Progress) and many were to follow. He was one of the chief editors of the magazine Majallat Al-Adib (revue des lettres) and the newspaper Al-Mouharrir. He wrote two volumes of poetry Noujoum fi Yadi (Stars between my hands-1965) and Doukhane min Al-Azmina Al-Mohtariqa (Smoke of glowing times). He was a member of parliament for the USFP between 1978 and 2002.

Works
Attaoura al khamissa (The fifth revolution) 
Noujoum fi Yadi (stars between my hands)
Doukhane min Al-Azmina Al-Mohtariqa (smoke of glowing times).
Al maghrib fi azamatihi atalat (Morocco and its three crises)

References
Marrakech News (retrieved on November 16, 2009) 24 Août 2008 

Moroccan writers
20th-century Moroccan historians
1922 births
2008 deaths
Socialist Union of Popular Forces politicians
Members of the House of Representatives (Morocco)
People from Tahannaout
People from Marrakesh